MTRX is a Swedish company running open access intercity railway services between Gothenburg and Stockholm. It is a subsidiary of MTR Corporation through MTR Nordic.

In July 2013, MTRX was awarded paths to operate services between Gothenburg and Stockholm. MTRX commenced operations on 21 March 2015. It has purchased six Stadler Flirt electric multiple units. The trains are very similar to the Norwegian units, maximum 200 km/h, but have more comfortable seats aimed for longer distances, and a small café area.

In July 2017, MTRX made headlines after a public poll to name one of its trains led to the name "Trainy McTrainface", in a nod to the near-naming of RRS Sir David Attenborough "Boaty McBoatface" in April 2016. Another train made headlines after being named Glenn, based on a joke saying that everyone are named Glenn in Gothenburg. Four players in IFK Göteborg were named Glenn in 1982 when the team won UEFA Cup, and all four including Glenn Hysén and Glenn Strömberg were present for the baptism ceremony.

References

External links

MTR Corporation
Railway companies of Sweden
High-speed trains of Sweden
Passenger trains running at least at 200 km/h in commercial operations
Railway companies established in 2015
Swedish companies established in 2015